Graham Hughes (born 1979) is a British adventurer and filmmaker.

Graham Hughes may also refer to:

Graham Hughes (cyclist) (1916–2013), New Zealand racing cyclist
Graham Hughes (director), Scottish film director

See also
Graeme Hughes (born 1955), Australian cricketer